This is a List of earthquakes in China, part of the series of lists of disasters in China. China has been the location of some of the most deadly earthquakes in history. The deadliest was the 1976 Tangshan earthquake with 300,000+ deaths. Earthquakes in the loess plateau where residents lived in yaodong caves tended to have big casualties, including the 1303 Hongdong and 1920 Haiyuan earthquakes. The most recent earthquake with a death toll of more than a thousand was the 2010 Yushu earthquake, which killed 2,698.

The collision of India with the rest of Asia has led to seismic activity throughout Western China, particularly in Tibet and the Yunnan, Xinjiang, Sichuan, Gansu and Qinghai provinces. However, these regions in comparison with Eastern China have a low population density. These areas also in general have poorer transport and building codes. Throughout China, poor building codes increases the damage and loss of life from earthquakes. The northern regions of Eastern China are not as seismically active as the western areas of the country, but earthquakes are still possible in this area.

Earthquake prediction was popular between 1966 and 1976, which overlapped with the Cultural Revolution. This reached its height with the successful prediction of the 1975 Haicheng earthquake. This earthquake had a prominent series of foreshocks and authorities who were eager to issue a warning. However very few earthquakes have both these criteria. The unpredictable and devastating 1976 Tangshan earthquake led to a reduction in the popularity of earthquake prediction in China.

Earthquakes

 = Richter magnitude scale 
 = Moment magnitude 
 = Body wave magnitude 
 = Surface wave magnitude

See also
List of disasters in China by death toll
Geology of China
List of earthquakes in Sichuan
List of earthquakes in Taiwan
List of earthquakes in Yunnan

References 

 China
China
Earthquakes
earthquakes